The 1858–59 United States Senate elections were held on various dates in various states. As these U.S. Senate elections were prior to the ratification of the Seventeenth Amendment in 1913, senators were chosen by state legislatures. Senators were elected over a wide range of time throughout 1858 and 1859, and a seat may have been filled months late or remained vacant due to legislative deadlock. In these elections, terms were up for the senators in Class 2.

The Republican Party gained five additional seats in the Senate, but the Democrats retained their majority.  That majority would erode in 1860 with the secession of the southern states leading up to the Civil War.

In Illinois, incumbent Stephen A. Douglas (D) and challenger Abraham Lincoln (R) held a series of seven debates, known as the "Lincoln–Douglas debates."

Results summary 
Senate party division, 36th Congress (1859-1861)

 Majority party: Democratic (38–25)
 Minority party: Republican (25–26)
 Other parties: American (2)
 Total seats: 66–68

Change in Senate composition

Before the elections

As a result of the elections

Race summaries

Special elections during the 35th Congress
In these elections, the winners were seated during 1858 or in 1859 before March 4; ordered by election date.

Races leading to the 36th Congress

In these regular elections, the winners were elected for the term beginning March 4, 1859; ordered by state.

All of the elections involved the Class 2 seats.

Elections during the 36th Congress
In this election, the winner was elected in 1859 on or after March 4; ordered by date.

Race leading to the 37th Congress

In this regular election, the winner was elected for the term beginning March 4, 1861.

This election involved a Class 3 seat.

Illinois 

Incumbent U.S. Senator Stephen Douglas, a Democrat, defeated a challenge by former U.S. Representative Abraham Lincoln, the Republican nominee. Lincoln, who had been a member of the Whig Party prior to 1856, attacked Douglas for his perceived subservience to the Slave Power, as evidenced by his support for the Kansas-Nebraska Act and the recent Supreme Court ruling in the case of Dred Scott v. Sanford. The election was extremely close, hinging on Douglas' ability to appeal to former Whigs who had resisted joining the Republicans following the decline of the Whig party after 1854. In the finale weeks of the campaign, Douglas received the coveted endorsement of Kentucky's John J. Crittenden, a prominent former Whig and Douglas' colleague in the Senate. Crittenden's support for Douglas considerably diminished Lincoln's chances of winning the election.

On election day, the statewide Republican ticket took 50.6% of the popular vote, outpolling the Democrats by a margin of 3,402 votes. Further down ballot, Republican candidates for the state legislature collectively received 24,094 more votes than the Douglas Democrats. (Buchanan Democrats received almost 10,000 votes, and there were a scattering of votes for write-in candidates.) Despite this, strategically drawn district boundaries produced Democratic majorities in both houses of the state legislature: 40 Democrats and 35 Republicans were elected to the state House of Representatives, while the Democratic margin in the Senate was 14–11. On the day of the election in the Illinois General Assembly, Douglas received 54 votes to Lincoln's 46. The change of just over 300 votes in three state legislative districts from Democrats to Republicans would have been sufficient to deny Democrats a legislative majority and defeat Douglas.

In spite of his defeat, Lincoln's debates with Douglas were followed nationally and established Lincoln as a leading contender for the Republican nomination in the 1860 United States presidential election. In the aftermath of the senatorial election, Lincoln contacted editors looking to publish the texts of the debates. George Parsons, the Ohio Republican committee chairman, got Lincoln in touch with Ohio's main political publisher, Follett and Foster, of Columbus. They published copies of the text under the title, Political Debates Between Hon. Abraham Lincoln and Hon. Stephen A. Douglas in the Celebrated Campaign of 1858, in Illinois. Four printings were made, and the fourth sold 16,000 copies.

See also
 1858 United States elections
 1858–59 United States House of Representatives elections
 35th United States Congress
 36th United States Congress
 Lincoln–Douglas debates

References

 Party Division in the Senate, 1789-Present, via Senate.gov